The 2007 FIA WTCC Race of France was the fourth round of the 2007 World Touring Car Championship season and the third running of the FIA WTCC Race of France. It was held on 3 June 2007 at the temporary Circuit de Pau street circuit in Pau, France. It was the headline event of the 2007 Pau Grand Prix. The first race was won by Alain Menu, whilst the second race was won by Augusto Farfus.

Classification

Qualifying 

Notes
1. – Both Farfus and Tarquini were handed ten-place grid penalties following qualifying.

Race 1

Race 2

References

External links

France
Race of France
Pau Grand Prix